Corrado Aprili (born 13 November 1964) is a former professional tennis player from Italy.

Biography
Aprili, a right-handed player from Verona, played on the professional circuit in the 1980s. He made the quarter-finals of a Grand Prix event in Palermo in 1986, with wins over Henrik Sundström and Richard Matuszewski, to reach his career best ranking of 108. In 1987 he defeated the top seeded Andrés Gómez at a tournament in Florence. He retired from professional tennis in 1990.

Now a tennis coach, Aprili runs a tennis school in Castel d’Azzano, a town in Verona.

References

External links
 
 

1964 births
Living people
Italian male tennis players
Sportspeople from Verona
20th-century Italian people